Cockermouth  is a market town and civil parish in the Borough of Allerdale in Cumbria, England, so named because it is at the confluence of the River Cocker as it flows into the River Derwent.  The mid-2010 census estimates state that Cockermouth has a population of 8,204, increasing to 8,761 at the 2011 Census.

Historically a part of Cumberland, Cockermouth is situated outside the English Lake District on its northwest fringe. Much of the architectural core of the town remains unchanged since the basic medieval layout was filled in the 18th and 19th centuries. The regenerated market place is now a central historical focus within the town and reflects events from its 800-year history. The town is prone to flooding and experienced severe floods in 2005, 2009, and 2015.

Etymology
Cockermouth is "the mouth of the River Cocker"; the river takes its name from the Brythonic Celtic word kukrā, meaning 'the crooked one'. It has frequently been noted on lists of unusual place names.

Geography
Cockermouth owes its existence to the confluence of the rivers Cocker and Derwent, being the lowest point, historically, at which the resultant fast flowing river powered by the Lake District could be bridged. Cockermouth is situated a few minutes' travelling distance from lakes such as Buttermere, Crummock Water, Loweswater, and Bassenthwaite.

Governance
The town is part of the parliamentary constituency of Workington. In the December 2019 general election, the Tory candidate for Workington, Mark Jenkinson, was elected as the Member of Parliament (MP), overturning a 9.4 per cent Labour majority from the 2017 election to eject shadow environment secretary Sue Hayman by a margin of 4,136 votes. Until the December 2019 general election The Labour Party has won the seat in the constituency in every general election since 1979.The Conservative Party has only been elected once in Workington since World War II, at the 1976 by-election. The town historically has been a Labour supporting area.

Prior to Brexit for the European Parliament its residents voted to elect MEP's for the North West England constituency.

Climate
Cockermouth has a temperate climate that is influenced by the Irish Sea and its low-lying elevation. Cockermouth receives slightly below average rainfall compared with the UK average. Temperatures are also round about average compared with other parts of the UK.

West Cumbria gets relatively little snow in comparison with the Lake District and Eastern Cumbria, owing to its proximity to the Irish Sea and its low height above sea level.

History
The Romans built a fort at Derventio Carvetiorum, now the adjoining village of Papcastle, to protect the river crossing on a major route for troops heading towards Hadrian's Wall.

The main town developed under the Normans who, after occupying the former Roman fort, built Cockermouth Castle closer to the river crossing: little remains today of the castle thanks to the efforts of Robert the Bruce. The market town developed its distinctive medieval layout, of a broad main street of burgesses' houses, each with a burgage plot stretching to a "back lane": the Derwent bank on the north and Back Lane (now South Street), on the south. The layout is largely preserved, leading the British Council for Archaeology to say in 1965 that it was worthy of special care in preservation and development.

Although Carlisle was considered the county town of Cumberland, Cockermouth shared the county assizes with Carlisle, and prior to the Reform Act 1832 was the usual venue for electing knights of the shire as MPs for Cumberland. Cockermouth borough was also a parliamentary borough from 1641 to 1918, returning two MPs until 1868 and one thereafter.

Market centre
The town market pre-dates 1221, when the market day was changed from Saturday to Monday. Market charters were granted in 1221 and 1227 by King Henry III, although this does not preclude the much earlier existence of a market in the town. In recent times, the trading farmers market now only occurs seasonally, replaced by weekend continental and craft markets.

In the days when opening hours of public houses were restricted, the fact that the pubs in Cockermouth could open all day on market days made the town a popular destination for drinkers, especially on Bank Holiday Mondays. The Market Bell remains as a reminder of this period (inset into a wall opposite the Allerdale Hotel), while the 1761 and Castle pub (which spans three floors) have been renovated to reveal medieval stonework and 16th and 18th-century features.

Architecture

Much of the centre of the town is of medieval origin, substantially rebuilt in Georgian style with Victorian infill. The tree-lined Kirkgate offers examples of unspoilt classical late 17th and 18th-century terraced housing, cobbled paving and curving lanes which run steeply down to the River Cocker. Most of the buildings are of traditional slate and stone construction with thick walls and green Skiddaw slate roofs.

Many of the facades lining the streets are frontages for historic housing in alleyways and lanes (often maintaining medieval street patterns) to the rear. There are examples of Georgian residences  near the Market Place, St. Helens Street, at the bottom of Castlegate Drive and Kirkgate.

Cockermouth may have been the first town in Britain to have piloted electric lighting. In 1881 six powerful electric lamps were set up to light the town, together with gas oil lamps in the back streets. The electrical service proved to be intermittent, and there was afterwards a return to gas lighting.

In 1964, Cockermouth was named one of 51 'Gem Towns' in the UK, by the Council for British Archaeology. This recognised the importance of the historic buildings, and the need for effective traffic management and urban development.

Present

The centre of Cockermouth retains much of its historic character and the renovation of Market Place has been completed, now with an artistic and community focus. The Kirkgate Centre is the town's major cultural focus and offers regular historical displays by the Cockermouth Heritage Group in addition to holding major cultural events including theatre, international music and world cinema. The tree-lined main street boasts a statue of Lord Mayo, formerly an MP for Cockermouth, who became British Viceroy of India and whose subsequent claim to fame was that he was assassinated.

The renovated arts and cultural zone in the 13th-century Market Place has undergone something of a "regeneration" following European Union funding, and is now pedestrian-friendly adorned with stone paving and roadways, underground lighting and controversial seating in bright colours to reflect the area's facades. Pavement art and stonework commemorate eclectic historical events, John Dalton's atomic theory, local dialect, flooding and a curious range other memorabilia.

A cycleway runs along the former Cockermouth, Keswick and Penrith Railway route, and spans a high bridge over the Cocker affording views of the town and river-scape.

Cockermouth suffered badly in the nationwide flood on 19 and 20 November 2009. Over 200 people needed to be rescued, with helicopters from RAF Valley, RAF Boulmer and RAF Leconfield retrieving about 50 and the remainder being rescued by boats, including those of the RNLI.
Many historic buildings on and adjacent to Main Street sustained severe damage, as did a number of bridges in and around the town. Recovery from the devastation was slow, with residents placed in temporary accommodation and some businesses temporarily relocated to Mitchells auction mart. By the summer of 2011 most of the damage had been repaired and buildings re-occupied, though some remained empty or boarded up.

Flooding occurred again in 2015 when the River Derwent burst its banks on 5 December, with several hundred homes and businesses affected.

Landmarks

Cockermouth Castle is a sizeable but partly ruined Norman castle, formerly the home of the late Pamela, The Dowager Lady Egremont. Built at the confluence of the Rivers Cocker and Derwent, the castle has a tilting tower which hangs Pisa-like over Jennings Brewery. The castle, with its preserved dungeons, is only opened to the public once a year during the annual town festival.

Wordsworth House, the birthplace of William Wordsworth, has been restored following extensive damage during the November 2009 floods, and features a working 18th-century kitchen and children's bedroom with toys and clothes of the times. Harris Park offers riverside walks and views down over the historic town.

Jennings Brewery offers regular public tours and occasional carriage rides pulled by a shire horse.

Cockermouth Town Hall is a former chapel which was converted for municipal use in 1934.

Culturally, the Kirkgate Centre offers international music, heritage, theatre and world cinema (including critically acclaimed and art-house movies on Monday evenings) and the town has an annual festival of concerts and performances each summer. Cockermouth has an annual Easter Fair, fireworks display and carnival. In April 2005 it hosted its first Georgian Fair, which was repeated in 2006, again in May 2008 and 2010, with the next fair on 2 May 2015. At Christmas the town presents festive lighting throughout its main and subsidiary streets, accompanied by competing shop displays.

The main cemetery on the Lorton Road is something of a walker's garden, featuring streams, humped stone bridges and views of the nearby fells.

The adjoining village of Papcastle is also picturesque in its own right, and stands on the site of the Roman fort of Derventio (Papcastle), lined with grand 18th- and 19th-century houses.

 northwest of the town lies Dovenby Hall Estate, a  park and woodland estate. Dovenby Hall is the home of the Ford Rally team. The estate was bought in January 1998 by Malcolm Wilson for his M-Sport motorsport team and that was selected in 1996 by Ford Motorsport to build, prepare and run a fleet of cars for entry into the World Rally Championship.

Economy and services
Built as a market town, close to a fast-flowing river in a farming area with a tradition of cloth weaving, Cockermouth became a hub for spinning and weaving. The town had a fulling mill by 1156 and by the mid-19th century there were over forty industrial sites; mills (wool, linen, cotton), hat factories, tanneries and smaller concerns making chairs, churns, mangle rollers, nails and farm machinery.

With the need for steam power, industrialisation declined, but the coming of the railway and the Victorian holiday, together with the power of Wordsworth's publications, meant that Cockermouth became an early inland tourist centre. The local economy is still reliant today on farming and tourism, with light industrial facilities servicing local needs. Industrialisation and hence work has moved to the west coast around Carlisle and Workington, and includes servicing the nuclear facilities at Sellafield.

Road haulier Lawsons Haulage Limited is a major employer in the town.

Education
Cockermouth has three primary schools: 
 Fairfield Primary School, 
 All Saints Church of England Primary School,
 St. Joseph's Catholic Primary School.

Cockermouth School is a comprehensive secondary school with around 1400 pupils including 310 sixth formers. The current Headteacher is Mr R J King. Cockermouth School won the regional championship in the north of England for the kids lit quiz 2009 coming 1st with 92 points

Transport

The Cockermouth, Keswick and Penrith Railway served the town. The original Cockermouth & Workington Railway station was replaced on a new alignment when the Cockermouth railway station opened to passenger traffic on 2 January 1865. The station was immortalised in 1964 in the song "Slow Train" by Flanders and Swann. The station closed on 18 April 1966 and has been completely removed. The site is now occupied by Cockermouth Mountain Rescue and the town's fire station, operated by Cumbria Fire and Rescue Service. The old trackbed is now a public walkway, with the nearest railway stations now being Maryport on the Cumbrian Coast Line, and Penrith and Carlisle, the latter two located on the West Coast Main Line.

Local bus services connect Cockermouth to Workington, Penrith and Carlisle, operated by Stagecoach North West. A free bus operates between Cockermouth and Buttermere with five return services per day.

The nearest major airport is Newcastle Airport. Leeds Bradford International Airport is a little further away, and further again is Manchester Airport, which offers a wider choice of destinations.

Two cycle routes pass through the town, the Sea to Sea Cycle Route from Workington to Tyneside, and the Reivers Cycle Route.

Sports and leisure
Cockermouth has a sports centre with swimming pool, two gyms, and two parks with riverside walks.

Cockermouth Cricket Club is one of the town's most successful and best supported sports teams. They play their home games at the Sandair Ground, located just off Gote Road. The First XI play in the North Lancashire and Cumbria League Premier Division, Second XI in the third tier of the same league. The club's Third XI play in the Cumbria Cricket League. The thriving junior section of the club runs from u11 up to u15. The current Club Captain is former Northamptonshire County Cricket Club batsman, Gareth White and for the 2015 season, the club's Overseas Professional is Fahad Masood, who has represented Pakistan 'A' in international cricket.

Cockermouth School has an Astroturf pitch used for community football, including the local 6-a-side league.

Cockermouth Rugby Football Club is based at the former Cockermouth Grammar School site and in 1987 played the first ever rugby union league match when they played Kirkby Lonsdale when the Rugby Union formed national and regional leagues, the precursors of what have now become the national and premier leagues.

The town has a youth football club, Cockermouth F.C. In the 2007–2008 season, the Under 12 team were County Cup Champions. Cockermouth beat Allerdale Leisure, from Workington, 1–0 in the final.

Notable residents
The town was the birthplace of William Wordsworth (1770–1850) and Dorothy Wordsworth (1771–1855). Others include:

Dorothy Bradford (1918–2008), painter and printmaker
Fletcher Christian (1764 in Eaglesfield – 1793 in Pitcairn), leader of the  mutiny
John Dalton (1766 in Eaglesfield – 1844), chemist, physicist and meteorologist; introduced the atomic theory into chemistry
Fearon Fallows (1788–1831), English astronomer & Astronomer Royal
Robert Milham Hartley (1796–1881), US emigrant & agent of the Association for Improving the Condition of the Poor
Robinson Mitchell (1821–1888), pioneer auctioneer
Ben Stokes (born 1991), cricketer
Jeff Thorpe (born 1972), retired footballer
Gareth White (born 1979), cricketer
Sir Joseph Williamson (1633 at Bridekirk – 1701), civil servant, diplomat and politician
Matthew Wilson (born 1987), rally driver.

Twin town
 Marvejols, France

See also

Listed buildings in Cockermouth

References

External links

 
  Cumbria County History Trust: Cockermouth (nb: provisional research only – see Talk page)
Cockermouth Town Council
Cockermouth at the Open Directory project
Life in 19th century Cockermouth and the Cragg Family

 
Towns in Cumbria
Civil parishes in Cumbria
Allerdale